Scabricola bicolor is a species of sea snail, a marine gastropod mollusk in the family Mitridae, the miters or miter snails.

Description
The species was first described by William Swainson under the name Mitra bicolor. The shell is smooth, polished, fusiform, white, with a brown central band. It seldom exceeds three-quarters of an inch in length.

Distribution
This marine species occurs off East Africa; in the Indian Ocean off Madagascar; Mauritius; Comoros; Seychelles

References

External links
 Gastropods.com: Imbricaria bicolor

Mitridae
Gastropods described in 1824